The Thodupuzha Block Panchayat is a local governing body in Kerala, India, operating under the Idukki District Panchayath. It was established in 1995 in accordance with the Kerala Panchayat Raj Act of 1994.  Its members are elected by representatives from 13 electoral division. The State Election Commission is responsible for conducting the elections.

Panchayaths in this jurisdiction 
 Muttom
 Purappuzha
 Krimkunnam
 Kumaramangalam
 Manakkad
 Edavetty

2020-2025 council 

Elections were conducted on 08 Dec 2020. Counting completed and results were announced on 16 Dec 2020. council.

2015-2020 council

2010-2015 council

2005-2010 council

2000-2005 council

See also
 2020 Kerala local body elections
 2015 Kerala local body elections
 Thodupuzha (Assembly constituency)
 Idukki (Lok Sabha constituency)
 Local government in India

References

 Local government in Kerala